Monika Mrklas (born 26 May 1942) is a German former cross-country skier and racing cyclist. She won the German National Road Race Championship in 1968.

Cross-country skiing results

Olympic Games

World Championships

References

External links

1942 births
Living people
German female cross-country skiers
German female cyclists
Olympic cross-country skiers of West Germany
Cross-country skiers at the 1968 Winter Olympics
Cross-country skiers at the 1972 Winter Olympics
Cyclists from Saxony
People from Meissen (district)
20th-century German women
21st-century German women